Senator McConnell most frequently refers to Mitch McConnell (born 1942), a U.S. senator from Kentucky since 1985 and the Senate Republican leader since 2007.

Senator McConnell may also refer to:

Members of the Northern Irish Senate
Alexander McConnell (1915–?), Northern Irish Senator from 1956 to 1961

Members of the United States Senate
William J. McConnell (1839–1925), U.S. Senator from Idaho from 1890 to 1891

United States state senate members
Felix Grundy McConnell (1809–1846), Alabama State Senate
Glenn F. McConnell (born 1947), South Carolina State Senate

See also
Rose McConnell Long (1892–1970), U.S. Senator from Louisiana from 1936 to 1937